A parametric oscillator is a driven harmonic oscillator in which the oscillations are driven by varying some parameter of the system at some frequency, typically different from the natural frequency of the oscillator. A simple example of a parametric oscillator is a child pumping a playground swing by periodically standing and squatting to increase the size of the swing's oscillations. The child's motions vary the moment of inertia of the swing as a pendulum. The "pump" motions of the child must be at twice the frequency of the swing's oscillations. Examples of parameters that may be varied are the oscillator's resonance frequency  and damping .

Parametric oscillators are used in several areas of physics. The classical varactor parametric oscillator consists of a semiconductor varactor diode connected to a resonant circuit or cavity resonator. It is driven by varying the diode's capacitance by applying a varying bias voltage. The circuit that varies the diode's capacitance is called the "pump" or "driver". In microwave electronics, waveguide/YAG-based parametric oscillators operate in the same fashion. Another important example is the optical parametric oscillator, which converts an input laser light wave into two output waves of lower frequency.

When operated at pump levels below oscillation, the parametric oscillator can amplify a signal, forming a parametric amplifier (paramp). Varactor parametric amplifiers were developed as low-noise amplifiers in the radio and microwave frequency range. The advantage of a parametric amplifier is that it has much lower noise than an amplifier based on a gain device like a transistor or vacuum tube. This is because in the parametric amplifier a reactance is varied instead of a (noise-producing) resistance. They are used in very low noise radio receivers in radio telescopes and spacecraft communication antennas.

Parametric resonance occurs in a mechanical system when a system is parametrically excited and oscillates at one of its resonant frequencies. Parametric excitation differs from forcing since the action appears as a time varying modification on a system parameter.

History
Parametric oscillations were first noticed in mechanics. Michael Faraday (1831) was the first to notice oscillations of one frequency being excited by forces of double the frequency, in the crispations (ruffled surface waves) observed in a wine glass excited to "sing". Franz Melde (1860) generated parametric oscillations in a string by employing a tuning fork to periodically vary the tension at twice the resonance frequency of the string. Parametric oscillation was first treated as a general phenomenon by Rayleigh (1883,1887).

One of the first to apply the concept to electric circuits was George Francis FitzGerald, who in 1892 tried to excite oscillations in an LC circuit by pumping it with a varying inductance provided by a dynamo.
 Parametric amplifiers (paramps) were first used in 1913-1915 for radio telephony from Berlin to Vienna and Moscow, and were predicted to have a useful future (Ernst Alexanderson, 1916). These early parametric amplifiers used the nonlinearity of an iron-core inductor, so they could only function at low frequencies.

In 1948 Aldert van der Ziel pointed out a major advantage of the parametric amplifier: because it used a variable reactance instead of a resistance for amplification it had inherently low noise. A parametric amplifier used as the front end of a radio receiver could amplify a weak signal while introducing very little noise. In 1952 Harrison Rowe at Bell Labs extended some 1934 mathematical work on pumped oscillations by Jack Manley and published the modern mathematical theory of parametric oscillations, the Manley-Rowe relations.

The varactor diode invented in 1956 had a nonlinear capacitance that was usable into microwave frequencies. The varactor parametric amplifier was developed by Marion Hines in 1956 at Western Electric. At the time it was invented microwaves were just being exploited, and the varactor amplifier was the first semiconductor amplifier at microwave frequencies. It was applied to low noise radio receivers in many areas, and has been widely used in radio telescopes, satellite ground stations, and long-range radar. It is the main type of parametric amplifier used today. Since that time parametric amplifiers have been built with other nonlinear active devices such as Josephson junctions.

The technique has been extended to optical frequencies in optical parametric oscillators and amplifiers which use nonlinear crystals as the active element.

Mathematical analysis
A parametric oscillator is a harmonic oscillator whose physical properties vary with time. The equation of such an oscillator is

By assumption, the parameters  and  depend only on time and do not depend on the state of the oscillator.

If the parameters vary at roughly twice the natural frequency of the oscillator (defined below), the oscillator phase-locks to the parametric variation and absorbs energy at a rate proportional to the energy it already has. (This phenomenon is called parametric excitation, parametric resonance or parametric pumping.) However, if the initial amplitude is zero, it will remain so; this distinguishes it from the non-parametric resonance of driven simple harmonic oscillators, in which the amplitude grows linearly in time regardless of the initial state.

A familiar experience of both parametric and driven oscillation is playing on a swing. Rocking back and forth pumps the swing as a driven harmonic oscillator, but once moving, the swing can also be parametrically driven by alternately standing and squatting at key points in the swing arc. This changes moment of inertia of the swing and hence the resonance frequency, and children can quickly reach large amplitudes provided that they have some amplitude to start with (e.g., get a push). Standing and squatting at rest, however, leads nowhere.

Transformation of the equation

We begin by making a change of variable

where  is the time integral of the damping coefficient
.

This change of variable eliminates the damping term in the differential equation, reducing it to

where the transformed frequency is defined as
.

In general, the variations in damping and frequency are relatively small perturbations

The transformed frequency can then be written in a similar way as
,

where  is the natural frequency of the damped harmonic oscillator

and
.

Thus, our transformed equation can be written as
.

The converse conclusion is that any form of parametric excitation can be accomplished by varying either the resonance frequency or the damping, or both.

Solution of the transformed equation
Let us assume that  is sinusoidal with a frequency approximately twice the natural frequency of the oscillator:

where the pumping frequency  but need not equal  exactly. Using the method of variation of parameters, the solution  to our transformed equation may be written as

The result is the following pair of coupled differential equations:

.

This system of linear differential equations with constant coefficients can be decoupled and solved by eigenvalue/eigenvector methods. This yields the solution

,

The eigenvalues are given by
.

.

This is the condition for parametric resonance, with the growth rate given by the positive eigenvalue . Note, however, that this growth rate corresponds to the amplitude of the transformed variable , whereas the amplitude of the untransformed variable  can either grow or decay depending on whether  is increasing or decreasing.

Intuitive derivation of parametric excitation
The above derivation may seem like a mathematical sleight-of-hand, so it may be helpful to give an intuitive derivation. The  equation may be written in the form

which represents a simple harmonic oscillator (or, alternatively, a bandpass filter) being driven by a signal  that is proportional to its response .

Assume that  already has an oscillation at frequency  and that the pumping  has double the frequency and a small amplitude . Applying a trigonometric identity for products of sinusoids, their product  produces two driving signals, one at frequency  and the other at frequency .

Being off-resonance, the  signal is attenuated and can be neglected initially. By contrast, the  signal is on resonance, serves to amplify , and is proportional to the amplitude . Hence, the amplitude of  grows exponentially unless it is initially zero.

This explains why the pumping frequency must be near , twice the natural frequency of the oscillator.

Parametric resonance
Parametric resonance is the parametrical resonance phenomenon of mechanical perturbation and oscillation at certain frequencies (and the associated harmonics). This effect is different from regular resonance because it exhibits the instability phenomenon.

Parametric resonance occurs in a mechanical system when a system is parametrically excited and oscillates at one of its resonant frequencies. Parametric resonance takes place when the external excitation frequency equals twice the natural frequency of the system. Parametric excitation differs from forcing since the action appears as a time varying modification on a system parameter. The classical example of parametric resonance is that of the vertically forced pendulum.

For small amplitudes and by linearising, the stability of the periodic solution is given by Mathieu's equation:

where  is some perturbation from the periodic solution. Here the  term acts as an ‘energy’ source and is said to parametrically excite the system. The Mathieu equation describes many other physical systems to a sinusoidal parametric excitation such as an LC Circuit where the capacitor plates move sinusoidally.

Parametric amplifiers

Introduction
A parametric amplifier is implemented as a mixer. The mixer's gain shows up in the output as amplifier gain. The input weak signal is mixed with a strong local oscillator signal, and the resultant strong output is used in the ensuing receiver stages.

Parametric amplifiers also operate by changing a parameter of the amplifier. Intuitively, this can be understood as follows, for a variable capacitor-based amplifier.
Charge  in a capacitor obeys:

therefore the voltage across is

Knowing the above, if a capacitor is charged until its voltage equals the sampled voltage of an incoming weak signal, and if the capacitor's capacitance is then reduced (say, by manually moving the plates further apart), then the voltage across the capacitor will increase. In this way, the voltage of the weak signal is amplified.

If the capacitor is a varicap diode, then "moving the plates" can be done simply by applying time-varying DC voltage to the varicap diode. This driving voltage usually comes from another oscillator—sometimes called a "pump".

The resulting output signal contains frequencies that are the sum and difference of the input signal (f1) and the pump signal (f2): (f1 + f2) and (f1 − f2).

A practical parametric oscillator needs the following connections: one for the "common" or "ground", one to feed the pump, one to retrieve the output, and maybe a fourth one for biasing. A parametric amplifier needs a fifth port to input the signal being amplified. Since a varactor diode has only two connections, it can only be a part of an LC network with four eigenvectors with nodes at the connections. This can be implemented as a transimpedance amplifier, a traveling-wave amplifier or by means of a circulator.

Mathematical equation
The parametric oscillator equation can be extended by adding an external driving force :
.

We assume that the damping  is sufficiently strong that, in the absence of the driving force , the amplitude of the parametric oscillations does not diverge, i.e., that . In this situation, the parametric pumping acts to lower the effective damping in the system. For illustration, let the damping be constant  and assume that the external driving force is at the mean resonance frequency , i.e., . The equation becomes

whose solution is approximately
.

As  approaches the threshold , the amplitude diverges. When , the system enters parametric resonance and the amplitude begins to grow exponentially, even in the absence of a driving force .

Advantages
It is highly sensitive
low noise level amplifier for ultra high frequency and microwave radio signal

Other relevant mathematical results
If the parameters of any second-order linear differential equation are varied periodically, Floquet analysis shows that the solutions must vary either sinusoidally or exponentially.

The  equation above with periodically varying  is an example of a Hill equation. If  is a simple sinusoid, the equation is called a Mathieu equation.

See also
Harmonic oscillator
Mathieu equation
Optical parametric amplifier
Optical parametric oscillator

References

Further reading
Kühn L. (1914) Elektrotech. Z., 35, 816-819.

Pungs L. DRGM Nr. 588 822 (24 October 1913); DRP Nr. 281440 (1913); Elektrotech. Z., 44, 78-81 (1923?); Proc. IRE, 49, 378 (1961).
Elmer, Franz-Josef, "Parametric Resonance Pendulum Lab University of Basel". unibas.ch, July 20, 1998.
Cooper, Jeffery, "Parametric Resonance in Wave Equations with a Time-Periodic Potential". SIAM Journal on Mathematical Analysis, Volume 31, Number 4, pp. 821–835. Society for Industrial and Applied Mathematics, 2000.
"Driven Pendulum: Parametric Resonance". phys.cmu.edu (Demonstration of physical mechanics or classical mechanics. Resonance oscillations set up in a simple pendulum via periodically varying pendulum length.)
Mumford, W. W., "Some notes on the history of parametric transducers". Proceedings of the IRE, Volume 98, Number 5, pp. 848–853. Institute of Electrical and Electronics Engineers, May 1960.

External links
Tim's Autoparametric Resonance — a video by Tim Rowett showing how autoparametric resonance appears in a pendulum made with a spring.

Amplifiers
Dynamical systems
Electronic oscillators
Ordinary differential equations